Məmmədsabir (also, Mammadsabir) is a municipality and village in the Sharur District of Nakhchivan, Azerbaijan. Its population is busy with beet-growing and vegetable-growing. There are secondary school, club, library and a medical center in the village. It has a population of 967.

Etymology
In the sources, in the 2nd half of the 19th century, the village name has been mentioned as a settlement which consist of 21 houses. The name of the village is related with the person name of the Məmmədsabir.

References

Populated places in Sharur District